Zachary Arnett (born September 10, 1986) is an American football coach who is the head coach at Mississippi State University. He previously served as the defensive coordinator and as position coach at Mississippi State from 2020 to 2022.

Arnett played college football at the University of New Mexico as a linebacker from 2005 to 2008. Prior to his tenure at Mississippi State, he held various assistant coaching positions at San Diego State University from 2011 to 2019.

Playing career

Arnett attended La Cueva High School and was a two-sport athlete in  football and baseball. He originally accepted an offer to play for the New Mexico Lobos baseball team, but he earned a scholarship to the football team in the summer of 2005. He excelled on the field and in the classroom during his college career, earning six forced fumbles and was a first-team Academic All-American in 2008.

Coaching career

San Diego State
After being away from football for two years, he became a graduate assistant at San Diego State under his New Mexico head coach Rocky Long. Within three years, he was promoted to linebackers coach. His linebacker unit produced five different All-Mountain West selections, including 3-time All-Mountain West selection Calvin Munson. In 2018, he was promoted again, this time to defensive coordinator. Under him, San Diego State ranked 32nd in total defense in 2018 and 2nd in 2019, which was a 30-place gain from the year before.

Mississippi State
On January 11, 2020, Arnett was named the new defensive coordinator at Syracuse. However, the stint with Syracuse was short-lived, as he was hired as the defensive coordinator and linebackers coach by Mississippi State on January 22, 2020. He would inherit a defense that ranked 73rd in total defense and losing seven starters.
Before the 2021 season, Arnett interviewed with big programs like Oregon, LSU, and Texas for their defensive coordinator vacancies, before ultimately deciding to stay at Mississippi State.

Arnett was named interim head coach at Mississippi State after Mike Leach was hospitalized on December 11, 2022. After Leach's death, Arnett was named full-time head coach on December 15, 2022.

Personal life
Arnett is married with two children.

Head coaching record

College

References

External links
 Mississippi State Bulldogs bio
 San Diego State Aztecs bio

1986 births
Living people
American football linebackers
La Cueva High School alumni
Mississippi State Bulldogs football coaches
New Mexico Lobos football players
San Diego State Aztecs football coaches
People from Albuquerque, New Mexico
Coaches of American football from New Mexico
Players of American football from New Mexico